Tropaeolum , commonly known as nasturtium (literally "nose-twister" or "nose-tweaker"), is a genus of roughly 80 species of annual and perennial herbaceous flowering plants. It was named by Carl Linnaeus in his book Species Plantarum, and is the only genus in the family Tropaeolaceae. The nasturtiums received their common name because they produce an oil similar to that of watercress (Nasturtium officinale).

The genus Tropaeolum, native to South and Central America, includes several very popular garden plants, the most common being T. majus, T. peregrinum and T. speciosum.

Plants in this genus have showy, often intensely bright flowers and rounded, peltate (shield-shaped) leaves with the petiole in the centre. The flowers are bisexual and zygomorphic, with five petals, a superior three-carpelled ovary, and a funnel-shaped nectar spur at the back, formed by modification of one of the five sepals.

History 
Tropaeolum was introduced into Spain by the Spanish botanist Nicolás Monardes, who described it in his  Historia medicinal de las cosas que se traen de nuestras Indias Occidentales of 1569, translated into English as Ioyfull newes out of the newe founde worlde by John Frampton. The English herbalist John Gerard reports having received seeds of the plant from Europe in his 1597 book Herball, or Generall Historie of Plantes. Tropaeolum majus was named by the Swedish botanist Carl Linnaeus, who chose the genus name because the plant reminded him of an ancient custom: After victory in battle, the Romans erected a trophy pole (or tropaeum, from the Greek tropaion, source of English "trophy") on which the vanquished foe's armour and weapons were hung. The plant's round leaves reminded Linnaeus of shields and its flowers of blood-stained helmets.

Nasturtiums were once commonly called "Indian cresses" because they were introduced from the Americas, known popularly then as the Indies, and used like cress as salad ingredients. In his herbal, John Gerard compared the flowers of the "Indian Cress" to those of the forking larkspur (Consolida regalis) of the buttercup family. He wrote: "Unto the backe part (of the flower) doth hange a taile or spurre, such as hath the Larkes heele, called in Latine Consolida regalis."

J. R. R. Tolkien commented that an alternative anglicization of "nasturtium" was "nasturtian".

Description 

Tropaeolum is a genus of dicotyledonous annual or perennial plants, often with somewhat succulent stems and sometimes tuberous roots. The alternate leaves are hairless, peltate, and entirely or palmately lobed. The petioles or leaf stalks are long and, in many species, can twine around other stems to provide support. The flowers are bisexual and showy, set singly on long stalks in the axils of the leaves. They have five sepals, the uppermost of which is elongated into a nectar spur. The five petals are clawed, with the lower three unlike the upper two. The eight stamens are in two whorls of unequal length, and the superior ovary has three segments and three stigmas on a single style. The fruit is naked and nut-like, with three single seed segments.

Species in cultivation 

The most common flower in cultivation is a hybrid of T. majus, T. minus, and T. peltophorum. It is commonly known as the nasturtium (and occasionally anglicized as nasturtian). It is mostly grown from seed as a half-hardy annual, and both single and double varieties are available. It comes in various forms and colours, including cream, yellow, orange and red, solid in colour or striped and often with a dark blotch at the base of the petals. It is vigorous and easily grown and does well in sun. It thrives in poor soil and dry conditions, whereas rich soil produces much leafy growth and few flowers. Some varieties adopt a bush form while others scramble over and through other plants and are useful for planting in awkward spots or for covering fences and trellises.

The following cultivars have gained the Royal Horticultural Society's Award of Garden Merit:
 'Alaska Series'
 'Hermine Grashoff'
 'Whirlybird Series'

Tropaeolum brachyceras has  yellow flowers with purplish markings on wiry, climbing stems. It is a half-hardy perennial from Chile and may remain dormant for several years before being sparked into growth by some unknown trigger factor.

Tropaeolum hookerianum is a tuberous-rooted species from Chile. There are two subspecies, T. h. austropurpureum which has violet-purple flowers and T. h. pilosum with yellow flowers.

The Canary creeper (Tropaeolum peregrinum) is a trailing and climbing half-hardy annual species with wiry stalks and palmately lobed leaves. The pale yellow, fringed flowers are borne on long stalks. It originated from Peru but may first have been cultivated in the Canary Islands before being introduced into Western Europe.

Wreath nasturtium (Tropaeolum polyphyllum) is a prostrate plant originating from Argentina and Chile. It has silvery, deeply lobed leaves and a profusion of small, bright yellow flowers on long trailing stalks. After flowering, the plant dies back. It is a perennial with underground rhizomes which send up new shoots at intervals. It will survive for several years in a suitable sunny location with well-drained soil. It is a very hardy species; the tubers can grow at depths of  enabling the plant to survive at altitudes of as much as 3,300 metres (10,000 ft) in the Andes.

The flame flower (Tropaeolum speciosum) is well adapted to cool, moist climates and famously does well in Scotland. It sends up shoots that thread their way through hedges and shrubs and, when they emerge into the light, bear brilliant red flowers among small, five or six-lobed leaves. It is difficult to establish but is an attractive garden plant when it thrives. This plant has gained the Royal Horticultural Society's Award of Garden Merit.

Three-coloured Indian cress (Tropaeolum tricolor) is another tuberous, climbing species grown for its attractive red, purple and yellow tubular flowers. It comes from Chile and Bolivia and is a reliable winter-growing species.

Mashua (Tropaeolum tuberosum) is a perennial climbing plant from the Andes grown for its tuberous roots. It has been cultivated since ancient times, and depictions of it are found at archaeological sites pre-dating the Incas. It has leaves with five to seven lobes and small, long-spurred, red and yellow flowers. The tubers have an unpleasant smell when raw, which disappears on cooking. The cultivar T. tuberosum lineamaculatum 'Ken Aslet' has gained the Royal Horticultural Society's Award of Garden Merit.

Species originating from the coastal areas and lower foothills make most of their growth in winter, whereas the true alpine species are summer growers. Tuberous Tropaeolum species are well known for occasionally remaining dormant for one or more years. The species with underground rhizomes and tubers can be propagated from these, while other species are best raised from seed. Many growers favour fresh seed, but dried seed is also often successful. The containers should be kept at below  until the seedlings appear in about a month, as too high a temperature inhibits germination.

Uses

Culinary 

All parts of Tropaeolum majus are edible. The flower has most often been consumed, making for an especially ornamental salad ingredient; it has a slightly peppery taste reminiscent of watercress and is also used in stir fry. The flowers contain about 130 mg vitamin C per , about the same amount as is contained in parsley. Moreover, they contain up to 45 mg of lutein per 100 g, which is the highest amount found in any edible plant. The unripe seed pods can be harvested and dropped into spiced vinegar to produce a condiment and garnish, sometimes used in place of capers.

Mashua (T. tuberosum) produces an edible underground tuber that is a major food source in parts of the Andes.

Herbal medicine 
T. majus has been used in herbal medicine for respiratory and urinary tract infections.

In Germany, licensed physicians can prescribe the herbal antibiotic Angocin Anti-Infekt N, made from only nasturtium and horseradish root.

Companion planting and biological pest control 
Nasturtiums are used as companion plants for biological pest control, repelling some pests, acting as a trap crop for others and attracting predatory insects. While companion planting is a widespread notion and often adopted by home gardeners, there is little but anecdotal evidence to support these claims.

Taxonomy 
Tropaeolum was previously placed in the family Tropaeolaceae along with two other genera, Magallana Cav. and Trophaeastrum. The monotypic genus Magallana was characterised by having winged fruit, and the two species of Trophaeastrum lacked spurs. The genus Tropaeolum was diagnosed only by the absence of the characteristics of the other two genera. A molecular study undertaken in 2000 found Tropaeolum to be paraphyletic when the other two genera are segregated, so Magallana and Trophaeastrum were reduced to synonyms of Tropaeolum. Tropaeolaceae was thus rendered monogeneric, a family of only one genus.

Species 
"The Plant List", a collaboration between the Missouri Botanical Garden and the Royal Botanic Gardens, Kew, includes the following accepted names of Tropaeolum species names. Some that are under review are here marked "U".

References 

 
Brassicales genera
Medicinal plants
Taxa named by Carl Linnaeus